Baháʼí Faith in America may refer to:

 Baháʼí Faith in Central America
 Baháʼí Faith in North America
 Baháʼí Faith in South America